Amanda Marie Cinalli (born May 10, 1986) is an American soccer forward who played for Atlanta Beat of Women's Professional Soccer, Chicago Red Stars in Women's Premier Soccer League Elite and was a member of the United States U-23 women's national soccer team.  She attended Laurel School in Shaker Heights, Ohio, and the University of Notre Dame

References

External links
 US Soccer player profile
 Atlanta Beat player profile
 Notre Dame player profile

Saint Louis Athletica players
Notre Dame Fighting Irish women's soccer players
1986 births
Living people
Atlanta Beat (WPS) players
American women's soccer players
Women's association football forwards
Chicago Red Stars players
Women's Premier Soccer League players
Women's Professional Soccer players
Soccer players from Cleveland
Fort Wayne Fever (W-League) players
USL W-League (1995–2015) players
Women's Premier Soccer League Elite players